Saint Seiya Omega is an anime series produced by Toei Animation and a spin-off adapted from Masami Kurumada's manga series Saint Seiya, produced in commemoration of the 25th anniversary of the franchise. The series follows the adventures of Koga, a young man who becomes one of the goddess Athena's 88 soldiers known as Saints to protect the world from chaos and the forces of evil.

Directed by Morio Hatano and written by Reiko Yoshida, the series started airing in TV Asahi on April 1, 2012. Beginning with the second season, which premiered in Japan on April 7, 2013, Hatano was replaced by Tatsuya Nagamine and Kohei Kureta and Yoshida by Yoshimi Narita. Bandai Visual is collecting the series in both DVD and Blu-Ray format with each volume containing four episodes. The first DVD compilation of Saint Seiya Omega was released on August 24, 2012. Toshihiko Sahashi is the composer of the anime.

The series is organized according to seasons and chapters, with each season thus far containing two chapters and each chapter having its own opening theme song.

Like in most of the anime that are broadcast in Japan by TV Asahi, all the credits are incorporated into the opening themes and there are no endings or ending themes for the show.

Episode list

Season 1

Season 2

References

Omega

ja:聖闘士星矢Ω#各話リスト
zh:聖鬥士星矢Ω#各話列表